Superconducting steel is a concept in materials science, referring to the idea of a steel alloy that would behave as a superconductor. The term has appeared primarily in discussions of designs of imagined devices involving nuclear fusion or processes with still higher densities of power.

New York Times use 
In reporting results of geological surveys in Afghanistan in June 2010 in its on-line edition, the Times described niobium -- whose actual major economic uses include structural steel, non-ferrous alloys, and non-ferrous superconducting magnets -- as "a soft metal used in producing superconducting steel", and was widely quoted, often including the phrase "superconducting steel".

Two Times readers publicly contested this information, respectively labeling it as "wildly wrong" and saying "There is no such thing as 'superconducting steel.' " , no correction to the article has been appended by the Times.

References 

Steels
Superconductivity
Materials science
Journalism